Juan Sánchez Vidal (born January 3, 1958) is a model aircraft collector. Sánchez Vidal, born in the Palma de Mallorca, has over one thousand commercial airline models, a collection which many experts believe to be the largest aircraft collection in the world.

Sánchez Vidal began working with defunct Spanish airline Spantax, acquiring his first model, a Convair CV-990 of that airline, in 1973. He made friendships with co-workers of other airlines, and he began receiving more models.

Eventually, his hobby led him to meet some airline personalities, some of them famous celebrities, like Niki Lauda, Formula One champion and owner of Lauda Air. The largest model in his collection, a model of an Air France Airbus A320, was obtained after he traded one of his planes with a local Air France worker who also collects models. He also made a McDonnell Douglas MD-11 model of Air Europa, airline for which he works now. Air Europa never actually used this type of aircraft in real life.

He also has models of American Airlines' Boeing 757 and Boeing 767, the same type of aircraft used for the September 11, 2001 attacks.

Sánchez Vidal and his collection have been the objects of many reports and interviews by many specialized magazines.

In 2000, personnel at Barajas International Airport in Madrid negotiated with Sánchez Vidal so that he could display his collection at the international arrivals terminal of that airport. In March of that year, his collection began being showcased at that airport. The collection lasted there until 2003.

Sanchez Vidal is fluent in Spanish and Catalan.

References

External links
Sánchez Vidal interviewed (In Spanish) on Coleccionismo magazine

1958 births
Living people
Model aircraft
Collectors